Grayson Barber (born May 3, 2000) is an American professional soccer player who plays as a midfielder for Charlotte Independence in the USL League One.

Club career
Born and raised in Columbia, South Carolina, Barber began his career in the youth academy of Sporting Kansas City in 2015. In 2018, he began attending Clemson University and played college soccer with the Clemson Tigers.

Whilst at college, Barber also appeared for USL League Two side SC United Bantams in both 2018 and 2019.

On January 20, 2021, Barber returned to Sporting Kansas City and signed a homegrown player deal with the club. On May 1, 2021, Barber made his professional debut for Sporting Kansas City II, the club's reserve side in the USL Championship, against FC Tulsa, starting in the 0–2 defeat.

On February 14, 2022, Barber was waived by Kansas City.

Barber joined USL League One side Charlotte Independence on May 14, 2022.

Career statistics

References

External links
 Profile at Sporting Kansas City

2000 births
Living people
Sportspeople from South Carolina
American soccer players
Association football midfielders
Charlotte Independence players
Clemson Tigers men's soccer players
Sporting Kansas City players
Sporting Kansas City II players
USL Championship players
Soccer players from South Carolina
SC United Bantams players
USL League Two players